Marcellina may refer to:

People
 Marcellina (gnostic), a second-century Carpocratian Christian leader in Rome
 Saint Marcellina, a fourth-century Christian saint
 Marcellina Emmanuel, a Tanzanian middle-distance runner
 Marcellina Darowska, a beatified Polish nun

Other
 Marcellina (municipality), a municipality in Rome
 Marcellina Mountain, a mountain summit in the Rocky Mountains

See also
 Marcella (disambiguation)
 Marcelina, a genus of moths

Latin feminine given names